Vary is a rural locality (a village) in Chernovskoye Rural Settlement, Bolshesosnovsky District, Perm Krai, Russia. The population was 120 as of 2010. There is 1 street.

Geography 
Vary is located 21 km south of Bolshaya Sosnova (the district's administrative centre) by road. Chernovskoye is the nearest rural locality.

References 

Rural localities in Bolshesosnovsky District